Cornelius "Johnny" Hodges (July 25, 1907 – May 11, 1970) was an American alto saxophonist, best known for solo work with Duke Ellington's big band. He played lead alto in the saxophone section for many years. Hodges was also featured on soprano saxophone, but refused to play soprano after 1946. Along with Benny Carter, Hodges is considered to be one of the definitive alto saxophone players of the big band era.

After beginning his career as a teenager in Boston, Hodges began to travel to New York and played with Lloyd Scott, Sidney Bechet, Luckey Roberts and Chick Webb. When Ellington wanted to expand his band in 1928, Ellington's clarinet player Barney Bigard recommended Hodges. His playing became one of the identifying voices of the Ellington orchestra. From 1951 to 1955, Hodges left the Duke to lead his own band, but returned shortly before Ellington's triumphant return to prominence – the orchestra's  performance at the 1956 Newport Jazz Festival.

Biography

Early life
Hodges was born in the Cambridgeport neighborhood of Cambridge, Massachusetts, to John H. Hodges and Katie Swan Hodges, both originally from Virginia. After moving for a short period of time to North Cambridge, the family moved to Hammond Street in the South End of Boston, where he grew up with saxophonists Harry Carney (who would also become a long-term member of Duke Ellington’s big band), Charlie Holmes and Howard E. Johnson. His first instruments were drums and piano. While his mother was a skilled piano player, Hodges was mostly self-taught.

Once he became good enough, he played the piano at dances in private homes for $8 an evening. He had taken up the soprano saxophone by his teens. It was around this time that Hodges developed the nickname "Rabbit", which some people believe arose from his ability to win 100-yard dashes and outrun truant officers, while others, including Carney, said he was called by that name because of his rabbit-like nibbling on lettuce and tomato sandwiches.

When Hodges was 14, he went with his eldest sister to see Sidney Bechet play in Jimmy Cooper's Black and White Revue in a Boston burlesque hall. Hodges's eldest sister introduced him to Bechet, who asked him to play something on the soprano saxophone he had brought with him.  Hodges played "My Honey's Lovin' Arms" for Bechet, who was impressed with his skill and encouraged him to keep on playing and would also give Hodges formal saxophone lessons. Hodges built a name for himself in the Boston area before moving to New York City in 1924.

Duke Ellington
Hodges joined Duke Ellington's orchestra in November 1928. He was one of the prominent Ellington Band members who featured in Benny Goodman's 1938 Carnegie Hall concert. Goodman described Hodges as "by far the greatest man on alto sax that I ever heard."  Charlie Parker called him "the Lily Pons of his instrument." John Coltrane considered Hodges his first model on the saxophone, even calling him “the world's greatest saxophone player.”

Ellington's practice of writing tunes specifically for members of his orchestra resulted in the Hodges specialties, "Confab with Rab", "Jeep's Blues", "Sultry Sunset", and "Hodge Podge". Other songs recorded by the Ellington Orchestra which prominently feature Hodges's smooth alto saxophone sound are "Magenta Haze", "Prelude to a Kiss", "Haupe" (from Anatomy of a Murder) – also notable are the "seductive" and hip-swaying "Flirtibird", featuring the "irresistibly salacious tremor" by Hodges, "The Star-Crossed Lovers" from Ellington's Such Sweet Thunder suite, "I Got It Bad (And That Ain't Good)", "Blood Count" and "Passion Flower".

He had a pure tone and economy of melody on both the blues and ballads that won him admiration from musicians of all eras and styles, from Ben Webster and John Coltrane, who both played with him when he had his own orchestra in the 1950s, to Lawrence Welk, who featured him in an album of standards. His highly individualistic playing style, which featured the use of a wide vibrato and much sliding between slurred notes, was frequently imitated. As evidenced by the Ellington compositions named after him, he earned the nicknames Jeep and Rabbit – according to Johnny Griffin because "he looked like a rabbit, no expression on his face while he's playing all this beautiful music."

Saxophones
In the 1940s, Hodges played a Conn 6M (recognizable by its octave-key mechanism being on the underside of the neck) and later on a Buescher 400 (recognizable by its V-shaped bell-brace) alto saxophone. By the end of his career in the late 1960s, Hodges was playing a Vito LeBlanc Rationale alto (serial number 2551A), an instrument with unusual key-mechanisms (providing various alternative fingerings) and tone-hole placement, which gave superior intonation. Fewer than 2,000 were ever made. Hodges's Vito saxophone was silver-plated and extensively engraved on the bell, bow, body and key-cups of the instrument.

Death
Hodges's last performances were at the Imperial Room in Toronto, less than a week before his May 11, 1970, death from a heart attack, suffered during a visit to the office of a dental surgeon. His last recordings are featured on the New Orleans Suite, which was only half-finished when he died. He was married twice; he had a daughter by his first wife, Bertha Pettiford, and a son (John C. Hodges II) and a daughter (Lorna Lee) by his second wife, Edith Cue.

The loss of Hodges's sound prompted Ellington, upon learning of the musician's death from a heart attack, to lament to JET magazine: "The band will never sound the same without Johnny." In Ellington's eulogy of Hodges, he said: "Never the world's most highly animated showman or greatest stage personality, but a tone so beautiful it sometimes brought tears to the eyes—this was Johnny Hodges. This is Johnny Hodges."

Discography

As leader or co-leader
 1946:  Passion Flower (RCA)  with Willie Cook, Roy Eldridge, Quentin Jackson, Russell Procope, Ben Webster, Sam Woodyard
 1951:  Caravan (Prestige)  with Taft Jordan, Harold Baker, Juan Tizol, Duke Ellington, Billy Strayhorn, Oscar Pettiford, Sonny Greer
 1951-52: Castle Rock (Norgran)
 1952: In a Tender Mood (Norgran)
 1952-54: The Blues (Norgran)
 1951-54: More of Johnny Hodges (Norgran)
 1951-54: Memories of Ellington (Norgran) also released as In a Mellow Tone 
 1954: Used to Be Duke (Norgran)
 1952–55: Dance Bash (Norgran) also released as Perdido
 1955: Creamy (Norgran)
 1956: Ellingtonia '56 (Norgran)
 1956: Duke's in Bed (Verve)
 1957: The Big Sound (Verve)
 1958: Blues A-Plenty (Verve)
 1958: Not So Dukish (Verve) 
 1959: Johnny Hodges and His Strings Play the Prettiest Gershwin (Verve)
 1959: Back to Back: Duke Ellington and Johnny Hodges Play the Blues (Verve) with Duke Ellington
 1959: Side by Side (Verve) with Duke Ellington
 1960: A Smooth One (Verve)
 1960: Gerry Mulligan Meets Johnny Hodges (Verve) with Gerry Mulligan
 1961: Blue Hodge (Verve) with Wild Bill Davis
 1961:  Johnny Hodges with Billy Strayhorn and the Orchestra (Verve) 
 1961:  Johnny Hodges at Sportpalast Berlin (Pablo)  with Ray Nance, Lawrence Brown, Al Williams
 1963: Buenos Aires Blues (Johnny Hodges Quintet with Lalo Schifrin on piano) 
 1963:  Sandy's Gone (Verve)
 1963: Mess of Blues (Verve) with Wild Bill Davis
 1964: Everybody Knows Johnny Hodges (Impulse!)
 1964: Blue Rabbit (Verve) with Wild Bill Davis
 1965: Con-Soul & Sax (RCA Victor) with Wild Bill Davis
 1965: Joe's Blues (Verve) with Wild Bill Davis
 1965: Wings & Things (Verve) with Wild Bill Davis
 1965: Inspired Abandon (Impulse!) with Lawrence Brown
 1966: Stride Right (Verve) with Earl Hines
 1966: Blue Pyramid (Verve) with Wild Bill Davis
 1966: Wild Bill Davis & Johnny Hodges in Atlantic City (RCA Victor) with Wild Bill Davis
 1966: Blue Notes (Verve)
 1967: Triple Play (RCA Victor)
 1967: Don't Sleep in the Subway (Verve)
 1967: Swing's Our Thing (Verve) with Earl Hines
 1968: Rippin' & Runnin' (Verve)
 1970: 3 Shades of Blue (Flying Dutchman) with Leon Thomas and Oliver Nelson

As sideman

Hodges was not a member of Ellington's Orchestra before 1928, or during 1951–55, or after May 11, 1970, when Hodges died. Duke Ellington's earliest recordings date from 1924 and he died on May 24, 1974. The two men's discographies thus match almost exactly, bar exceptions listed above and in this section.
with Lawrence Brown
 Inspired Abandon (Impulse!, 1965) – billed as Lawrence Brown's All-Stars with Johnny Hodges
with Coleman Hawkins
Hawkins! Eldridge! Hodges! Alive! At the Village Gate! (Verve, 1962)
with Joya Sherrill
Joya Sherrill Sings Duke (20th Century Fox, 1965)
with Billy Strayhorn
 Cue for Saxophone (Felsted, 1959)
with Billy Taylor
 Taylor Made Jazz (Argo, 1959)
With Clark Terry
Duke with a Difference (Riverside, 1957)

References

External links

 Johnny Hodges recordings at the Discography of American Historical Recordings.

1907 births
1970 deaths
African-American saxophonists
American jazz clarinetists
American jazz saxophonists
American male saxophonists
Duke Ellington Orchestra members
Jazz alto saxophonists
Mainstream jazz saxophonists
Mainstream jazz clarinetists
Musicians from Cambridge, Massachusetts
Swing clarinetists
Swing saxophonists
Vocalion Records artists
20th-century American musicians
20th-century saxophonists
Jazz musicians from Massachusetts
American male jazz musicians
20th-century American male musicians